From 1935 to 1948, 66 American Western films were produced featuring the character Hopalong Cassidy, played in all the films by actor William Boyd. The films were at the time collectively known as "Hoppies". In the films, Hopalong, or "Hoppy", and his white horse, Topper, travel through the Old West while dispensing justice, usually with two companions: one young and trouble-prone with a weakness for damsels in distress, the other older, comically awkward and outspoken.

The juvenile lead was successively played by James Ellison, Russell Hayden, George Reeves, Rand Brooks, and Jimmy Rogers. George Hayes (later to become known as "Gabby" Hayes) originally played Cassidy's grizzled sidekick, Windy Halliday. After Hayes left the series because of a salary dispute with producer Harry Sherman, he was replaced by the comedian Britt Wood as Speedy McGinnis and finally by the veteran film comedian Andy Clyde as California Carlson. Clyde, the most durable of the sidekicks, remained with the series until it ended. A few actors of future prominence appeared in Cassidy films, notably Robert Mitchum, who appeared in seven films at the beginning of his career.

List of films

Produced by Harry Sherman for Paramount Pictures

Produced by Harry Sherman for United Artists

Produced by William Boyd for United Artists

Home media
After Boyd's death, his company devoted to Hopalong Cassidy, U.S. Television Office, retained control of Cassidy films but, by the mid-1960s, had withdrawn them from television and sales in home movie markets. This remained the situation until the mid-1990s, after many Cassidy fans had died, when the company made available to The Western Channel a package series of restored and cleaned negative-based prints of the films to cable TV.  These remained available on that channel until 2000, when they were again withdrawn.

On June 16, 2009, Echo Bridge Home Entertainment released the Hopalong Cassidy Ultimate Collector's Edition, which included all 66 theatrical films on 14 DVDs, packed into a facsimile Hopalong Cassidy tin lunchbox.

References

Film series introduced in 1935
American film series
American Western (genre) films